Un día perfecto is a science-fiction short film by Jacobo Rispa. It was awarded with the Goya in 1999, and received various other prizes in Alcine, Viña del Mar, and Festival Internacional de Cortometrajes de Vila Real.

External links

1999 films
1990s science fiction films